Karst as a surname may refer to one of the following persons.

Ed Karst (ca. 1931–1992), American attorney and politician
Friedrich Karst (1893–1975), German highly decorated Generalleutnant in the Wehrmacht
Gene Karst (1906–2004), American, first dedicated publicist in the history of MLB
John Karst (1893–1976) American professional baseball player
 John Karst (1836–1911), German born engraver
Kenneth L. Karst (1929–2019), professor at the University of California, Los Angeles (UCLA) was wrote extensively on constitutional law
Michael Karst (born 1952), German track and field athlete
Raymond W. Karst (1908–1987), an American former member of the United States House of Representatives
P.Karst, a standard abbreviation for Petter Adolf Karsten